Montclair Transcenter is an intermodal transit center located at 5091 Richton Street in Montclair, California. It is located between Central and Monte Vista Avenues on Richton Street just north of the Montclair Plaza shopping center.

The TransCenter is owned by the City of Montclair. Omnitrans, Foothill Transit, and the Riverside Transit Agency all provide bus service, with Foothill and RTA providing express service and Foothill and Omnitrans providing local service. It is also a station on the Metrolink San Bernardino Line.

The station serves as the dividing line between Foothill's service area and Omnitrans' service area. Omnitrans buses run to the east, while Foothill buses run to the west. Both agencies accept each other's passes for one transfer outbound from the station.

Connections 
Both bus and rail service are available 7 days a week.
Omnitrans: 66, 85, 88, 290
Foothill Transit Local: 188, 197, 480, 492
Foothill Transit Express: 699, and the Silver Streak, both to Los Angeles Union Station and downtown Los Angeles. 
RTA: 204 (Express to Downtown Riverside)
FlixBus boards approximately one mile south of station, north of the Montclair Place Mall on Moreno St., west of the intersection of Moreno St. and Monte Vista Ave.

Metro Rail 
A future phase of the Los Angeles Metro Rail Foothill Extension (soon part of the A Line) may terminate near this station.

References

External links 

 
 Omnitrans
 Foothill Transit

Metrolink stations in San Bernardino County, California
Montclair, California
Bus stations in San Bernardino County, California
Future Los Angeles Metro Rail stations
Railway stations in the United States opened in 1993
1993 establishments in California